Quick Amersfoort or BSC Quick is a baseball and softball club based in Amersfoort, the Netherlands.  Quick Amersfoort was established in 1961 by a group of football players looking for something to play in the summer months. The club has participated in the Honkbal Hoofdklasse since 2018. Quick Amersfoort currently numbers over 250 members and fields 6 youth baseball teams, 3 youth softball teams, 3 adult baseball teams, 4 adult men's softball teams, 3 adult women's softball teams, and 1 slow pitch team. The team plays its home games at XL Lease Park Dorrestein.

References

External links
Official Website (Dutch)

Baseball teams in the Netherlands
Softball teams in the Netherlands